Eugene Moses is a former mayor of Azusa, California.

Moses was elected mayor in 1982 and served until 1994, when he decided not to run for reelection in order to run for state senate which he lost. Moses was in the middle of a four-year city council term when he was elected mayor.

Moses is the current publisher of the San Gabriel Valley Examiner newspaper.

References

Living people
Mayors of places in California
Date of birth missing (living people)
Year of birth missing (living people)